Mountain Ash is an unincorporated community and coal town located in Whitley County, Kentucky, United States.

References

Unincorporated communities in Whitley County, Kentucky
Unincorporated communities in Kentucky
Coal towns in Kentucky